Cybulino may refer to the following places in West Pomeranian Voivodeship, Poland:

Cybulino, Koszalin County
Cybulino, Szczecinek County